Sujit Nayak (born 23 June 1989, full name Sujit Surendra Nayak) is an Indian cricketer who plays for Mumbai in the C.K Nayudu Trophy. He was born in Bombay (now Mumbai). He was brought by Mumbai Indians for the 2012 Indian Premier League (IPL) and the Delhi Daredevils for the 2013 IPL. He made his List A debut on 27 February 2014, for Mumbai in the 2013–14 Vijay Hazare Trophy.

References

Indian cricketers
Mumbai cricketers
Delhi Capitals cricketers
1989 births
Living people